The Communist Party of the Soviet Union is an organization which split from the Union of Communist Parties — Communist Party of the Soviet Union in 2001 after disagreements between Oleg Shenin and Gennady Zyuganov over the creation of a united communist party of the Union of Belarus and Russia. It had been led by Shenin until his death in May 2009.

Leaders 
 Oleg Shenin (21 July 2001 – 28 May 2009; as Chairman)
 Vladimir Berezin (20 March–16 July 2010; as First Secretary)
 Sergey Alexandrov (acting 21 July 2010; official from 20 November 2010–present)

Members

References

External links
Official website

2001 establishments in Russia
Communism in Tajikistan
Communism in Transnistria
Communism in Uzbekistan
Communist parties in Armenia
Communist parties in Azerbaijan
Communist parties in Belarus
Communist parties in Estonia
Communist parties in Georgia (country)
Communist parties in Kazakhstan
Communist parties in Kyrgyzstan
Communist parties in Lithuania
Communist parties in Russia
Communist parties in Ukraine
Left-wing political party alliances
Neo-Sovietism
Neo-Stalinist parties
Political parties established in 2001
Political parties in South Ossetia
Political parties in Tajikistan
Political parties in Transnistria
Political parties in Uzbekistan
Transnational political parties
International Meeting of Communist and Workers Parties